Helastia corcularia is a moth of the family Geometridae. This species is endemic to New Zealand. It was first described by Achille Guenée in 1868 and named Larentia corcularia.

References

Moths of New Zealand
Endemic fauna of New Zealand
Moths described in 1868
Taxa named by Achille Guenée
Cidariini
Endemic moths of New Zealand